Victor Baynard Woolley (March 29, 1867 – February 22, 1945) was a United States circuit judge of the United States Court of Appeals for the Third Circuit.

Education and career

Born in Wilmington, Delaware, Woolley received a Bachelor of Science degree from Delaware College (now the University of Delaware) in 1885. For a time he studied at Harvard Law School, but he read law to enter the bar in 1890. He was a prothonotary for the Superior Court of New Castle County, Delaware from 1895 to 1901. He was an Associate Justice of the Supreme Court of Delaware from 1900 to 1914.

Federal judicial service

On August 7, 1914, Woolley was nominated by President Woodrow Wilson to a seat on the United States Court of Appeals for the Third Circuit vacated by Judge George Gray. Woolley was confirmed by the United States Senate on August 12, 1914, and received his commission the same day. He assumed senior status on May 1, 1938, serving in that capacity until his death on February 22, 1945.

References

Sources
 

1867 births
1945 deaths
University of Delaware alumni
Harvard Law School alumni
Judges of the United States Court of Appeals for the Third Circuit
United States court of appeals judges appointed by Woodrow Wilson
20th-century American judges
United States federal judges admitted to the practice of law by reading law